Kenton Smith (born September 10, 1979) is a Canadian former professional ice hockey player.

Playing career
Smith began playing at major junior level for the Calgary Hitmen of the Western Hockey League (WHL) in 1995–96.  He competed for the Hitmen for five seasons, establishing himself as a cornerstone of the team during that time.  In 1998–99, he recorded 19 goals to establish a single-season team record by a defenceman (surpassed by Paul Postma's 23 goals in 2008–09), en route to leading his team to a President's Cup as WHL champions in 1999.  Smith played 386 games in total for the Hitmen, scoring 226 points and clocking 527 penalty minutes.

Smith began his professional career in 2000, splitting the season between the ill-fated Detroit Vipers of the International Hockey League (IHL) and the Johnstown Chiefs of the ECHL.  In his 13-game spell with the Chiefs, Smith would help them into the post season, when he himself would feature on four occasions.  His brief but promising showing with the Chiefs would ensure his return to the ECHL the following season, although for the Pensacola Ice Pilots.

Smith would impress for the Ice Pilots, and was rewarded with a call up to the American Hockey League (AHL) from the Springfield Falcons.  He would feature in 9 AHL games before returning to play at ECHL standard.  For the 2002-03 season, Smith would become a Charlotte Checkers player, and again showed his ability at ECHL level, scoring 22 points in 48 games.  Despite this, Smith would move again during the off-season, this time signing for the Columbus Cottonmouths.  He would feature in every one of the Cottonmouths regular season fixtures, helping out with 24 points along the way.

In 2004, Smith chose to return to the Charlotte Checkers, the beginning of a long and successful spell for both player and organisation.  The Checkers would make the post-season in all four seasons which Smith spent at the club, and the player himself managed to score 125 points in 282 games.  Smith did not miss a single regular season Checkers game from the start of the 2005-06 season until his departure at the end of the 2007-08 term.

In the summer of 2008, Smith was introduced to his first taste of European hockey, opting to sign for the Elite Ice Hockey League (EIHL)'s Manchester Phoenix under head coach Tony Hand with the contract being announced on June 10, 2008.  Smith has also been appointed as captain for the 2008–09 season.  Under Smith's often inspiring leadership, the Phoenix reached both the Knock-Out and Challenge Cup finals for the first time in their history as well as once again competing in the play-offs.  Despite the success brought to Manchester by the team, off-ice financial problems arose and in the summer of 2009, the organisation announced that it would compete in the English Premier Ice Hockey League for the 2009-10 season.  As a direct result, the budget would have to be dramatically reduced and therefore Smith, along with most of the senior squad, would be released.

He then joined HC Valpellice Bulldogs along with Manchester team mate David-Alexandre Beauregard.  After one season he returned to the UK with the Cardiff Devils along with his brother Mark. He remained for three seasons before moving to the Braehead Clan in 2013. In 2014, Smith moved to the English Premier Ice Hockey League and signed with the Swindon Wildcats. He was named player-assistant coach of the Wildcats for the 2015-16 season, but only made three appearances for the team during the season and he eventually retired at the end of the season.

Career statistics

References

External links

Kenton Smith Personal Profile, Manchester Phoenix Official Website.
Kenton Smith Checks in With Phoenix, Manchester Phoenix Official Website, 10/06/08
"Kenton Gives Phoenix Steel", Manchester Evening News, 12/06/08

1979 births
Living people
Braehead Clan players
Canadian expatriate ice hockey players in England
Canadian expatriate ice hockey players in Italy
Canadian expatriate ice hockey players in Scotland
Canadian expatriate ice hockey players in the United States
Canadian expatriate ice hockey players in Wales
Canadian ice hockey defencemen
Calgary Hitmen players
Cardiff Devils players
Charlotte Checkers (1993–2010) players
Columbus Cottonmouths (ECHL) players
Detroit Vipers players
HC Valpellice players
Johnstown Chiefs players
Manchester Phoenix players
Pensacola Ice Pilots players
Ice hockey people from Edmonton
Springfield Falcons players
Swindon Wildcats players
Naturalised citizens of the United Kingdom